Yucaipa-Calimesa Joint Unified School District is a school district serving Yucaipa (an incorporated area of San Bernardino County) and Calimesa (an incorporated area of Riverside County), in California, United States.

It has many schools: Calimesa Elementary School, Wildwood Elementary School, Chapman Heights Elementary School, Parkview Middle School, Mesa View Middle School, Yucaipa High School, and many others.

References

External links
 Yucaipa-Calimesa Joint Unified School District

School districts in San Bernardino County, California
School districts in Riverside County, California
Calimesa, California
Yucaipa, California